A chess diagram is graphic representation of a position in a chess game, using standardised symbols. Chess diagrams are widely used in chess publications as an aid to visualisation, or to aid the readers to verify that they are looking at the correct position on their chessboard or computer. The symbols used generally resemble the pieces of the standard Staunton chess set, although a number of different fonts have been used over the centuries.

Forsyth-Edwards Notation (FEN) can be used to represent a position without graphics, i.e. with letters and numbers only.

Examples

Further reading

External links
 Chess diagram variant

Chess theory
Diagrams